Prunus takesimensis is a species of cherry endemic to Ulleung Island, South Korea. A tree reaching 20m, it is used as an ornamental. Morphologically it most closely resembles Prunus sargentii but its chloroplast genome is most similar to Prunus serrulata var. spontanea (syn. Prunus jamasakura).

Uses
As an ornamental flowering cherry, it has above average tolerance to flooding, possibly the best in the genus. Prunus takesimensis individuals make up about 5% of the famous cherries of Washington, DC.

References

takesimensis
Cherry blossom
Cherries
Endemic flora of South Korea
Ornamental trees
Plants described in 1918